Immigrant Union is an Australian-American psychedelic folk/country band from Melbourne. It consists of Brent DeBoer (from The Dandy Warhols), Bob Harrow, Peter Lubulwa, Ben Street and Paddy McGrath-Lester. Courtney Barnett and her band consisting of Dave Mudie and Bones Sloane were members of Immigrant Union from 2011 to 2013 and feature on their second studio album Anyway.

References

External links 
 

Victoria (Australia) musical groups
Australian folk music groups
Psychedelic folk groups